Lok Sin Tong Yu Kan Hing Secondary School or Lok Sin Tong Yu Kan Hing School prior to 2004, is a secondary school of Chinese as a media of instruction (CMI) in Wang Tau Hom, New Kowloon, Hong Kong.

History
The school was the first secondary school to be run by Lok Sin Tong and was donated by Mr. Yu Kan Hing, and officially opened by Sir David Clive Crosbie Trench, the Governor of Hong Kong, and John Canning, Secretary of Education at 15December 1970. The first principal of the school was Dr. LI Sze-Bay, Albert, MBE, BBS, JP (1936-2010), who served the school from 1969-2000.

 the current and fourth principal is Lau Chun Hung.

School's motto
The school's motto is the same as that of other Lok Sin Tong schools:
Benevolence, Affection, Diligence and Faithfulness.

See also
 The Lok Sin Tong Benevolent Society, Kowloon

References

External links

 Official website

Secondary schools in Hong Kong
Wang Tau Hom
Lok Sin Tong